Rayleigh was a parliamentary constituency in Essex represented in the House of Commons of the Parliament of the United Kingdom. It elected one Member of Parliament (MP) by the first past the post system of election. It existed from 1997 to 2010.

History
This seat was created for the 1997 general election primarily from the abolished constituency of Rochford. It was abolished at the next redistribution which came into effect for the 2010 general election, when the town of Wickford was added to form the Rayleigh and Wickford constituency.

This largely rural constituency was the tenth-safest Conservative seat in the United Kingdom and the second-safest seat in Essex.

Boundaries
The District of Rochford wards of Ashingdon, Canewdon, Downhall, Grange and Rawreth, Hawkwell East, Hawkwell West, Hockley Central, Hockley East, Hockley West, Hullbridge Riverside, Hullbridge South, Lodge, Rayleigh Central, Trinity, Wheatley, and Whitehouse, and the Borough of Chelmsford wards of East and West Hanningfield, Rettendon and Runwell, South Hanningfield, South Woodham-Collingwood East, and West and South Woodham-Elmwood and Woodville.

Centred around the town of Rayleigh, the seat was formed primarily from the abolished County Constituency of Rochford, but excluding the town of Rochford itself. Small area to the north, including the town of South Woodham Ferrers, transferred from the abolished County Constituency of Chelmsford.

Following their review of parliamentary representation in Essex, which came into effect for the 2010 general election, the Boundary Commission for England made radical alterations to existing constituencies to allow for the number of parliamentary seats in the county to be increased to eighteen. These changes include the formation of a number of new constituencies in the southern and eastern parts of the county.

Rayleigh was abolished, with the bulk of the constituency, comprising the District of Rochford wards, forming the new County Constituency of Rayleigh and Wickford, together with the town of Wickford, previously part of the abolished County Constituency of Billericay. The Borough of Chelmsford wards were transferred to the new County Constituency of Witham.

Members of Parliament

Elections

Elections in the 2000s

Elections in the 1990s
The 1997 election result has swings relative to the notional, not the actual, 1992 result.

See also
 List of parliamentary constituencies in Essex

Notes and references

Constituencies of the Parliament of the United Kingdom established in 1997
Constituencies of the Parliament of the United Kingdom disestablished in 2010
Parliamentary constituencies in Essex (historic)
Rayleigh, Essex